Helferella is a genus of beetles in the family Buprestidae, containing the following species:

 Helferella abbreviata (Carter, 1926)
 Helferella dianae Cobos, 1957
 Helferella elata (Carter, 1926)
 Helferella fiji Bellamy, 1991
 Helferella frenchi (Théry, 1928)
 Helferella gothmogoides, named after Gothmog of The Lord of the Rings Williams & Weir, 1988
 Helferella macalpinei Williams & Weir, 1987
 Helferella manningensis Williams & Weir, 1987
 Helferella miyal Williams & Weir, 1987
 Helferella oborili Bílý & Nakládal, 2010
 Helferella papuae Bellamy, 1991
 Helferella philippinensis Bellamy, 1991
 Helferella tolgae Williams & Weir, 1988
 Helferella vanuae Bellamy, 1991
 Helferella viti Bellamy, 1991
 Helferella webbensis Williams & Weir, 1987

References

Buprestidae genera